meso-Zeaxanthin (3R,3´S-Zeaxanthin) is a xanthophyll carotenoid, as it contains oxygen and hydrocarbons, and is one of the three stereoisomers of zeaxanthin. Of the three stereoisomers, meso-zeaxanthin is the second most abundant in nature after 3R,3´R-zeaxanthin, which is produced by plants and algae. To date, meso-zeaxanthin has been identified in specific tissues of marine organisms and in the macula lutea, also known as the "yellow spot", of the human retina.

Occurrence in nature and in food supplements 
Carotenoids are essential for animal life, but animals cannot produce them. Indeed, animals obtain carotenoids from diet, with herbivores sourcing them from plants or algae, and carnivores, in turn, sourcing them from herbivores. However, there is a general consensus that meso-zeaxanthin is not present in plants, except for marine species. Originally, it was suggested that meso-zeaxanthin was non-dietary in origin and generated at the macula (the central part of the retina) from retinal lutein (another xanthophyll carotenoid found in the human diet), but this work (limited to animal studies) has since been refuted. Indeed, and consistent with the work by Maoka in 1986, Nolan et al. have shown that meso-zeaxanthin is present in the skin of trout, sardine and salmon, and in the flesh of trout. In a subsequent publication, Nolan's group detected and quantified the three stereoisomers of zeaxanthin, including meso-zeaxanthin, in the flesh of two different trout species. This is the first publication to report the concentrations of meso-zeaxanthin in a habitually consumed food. Using data from this publication, it is estimated that when an average sized trout (circa 200 g) is consumed, 0.2 mg of natural meso-zeaxanthin is obtained from this source. Moreover, canned sardines can also be considered as a habitual source of meso-zeaxanthin for humans, as sardines presented commercially in this way contain a significant amount of skin, which contains meso-zeaxanthin. However, the concentration of meso-zeaxanthin in sardine skin has not been determined yet. Previously to this research, a publication from Khachick et al., (2002) reported that liver from Japanese Quail (Coturnix japonica) and frog plasma contain meso-zeaxanthin. Of note, frog legs are consumed habitually in France, as they are considered a delicacy of French cuisine.

Also, it is possible that meso-zeaxanthin is generated from other carotenoids consumed in the diet, as carotenoids are known to convert into different carotenoids for functional reasons.  For example, it has been suggested that meso-zeaxanthin of trout integuments is derived from astaxanthin, and meso-zeaxanthin in primates (macula lutea) is derived (at least in part) from lutein.

Specific commercially available food supplements actively use meso-zeaxanthin in their supplement formulations, in order to increase eye concentrations of these nutrients, and in an attempt to support macular health. These supplements contain 10 mg of meso-zeaxanthin, along with 10 mg of lutein and 2 mg of zeaxanthin. A recent study conducted to test the concordance of carotenoid concentrations of commercially available food supplements to their label claim found that the measured lutein concentrations (in all the supplements tested) was close to the declared amounts, but that the zeaxanthin concentrations measured varied greatly. In addition, in some of the formulations tested, it was found that meso-zeaxanthin was present in the formulation, even though this carotenoid was not declared on the supplement product labels. The authors concluded that the presence of meso-zeaxanthin in these formulations was likely due to the process used to extract lutein from the marigold petal.

In the macula 

Meso-zeaxanthin, lutein, and 3R,3´R-zeaxanthin are the main carotenoids in the macula lutea, found in a ratio of 1:1:1, and are collectively referred to as macular pigment (MP). Meso-zeaxanthin is concentrated at the epicentre of the macula, where it accounts for around 50% of MP at this location, with lutein dominating the peripheral macula (see figure 2).

As an antioxidant and short-wavelength light filter 

Of the three macular carotenoids (lutein, zeaxanthin and meso-zeaxanthin), meso-zeaxanthin is the most powerful antioxidant, but a combination of the macular carotenoids has been shown to exhibit greatest antioxidant potential, when compared to the individual carotenoids at the same total concentration.  This may explain why the human macula uniquely contains these three carotenoids from the circa 700 carotenoids present in nature. Also, it has been shown that the combination of the carotenoids results in optimal light filtration (i.e. filtration of short-wavelength [blue] light) at the macula. This is important because short-wavelength light incident at the macula causes chromatic aberration and light scatter, phenomena that adversely impact on visual function and result in poor contrast sensitivity. Meso-zeaxanthin is in the ideal location and has the ideal antioxidant and light-filtering properties to protect the macula and enhance visual performance.

Use in supplements aimed at eye health 
In 2013, the Age-Related Eye Disease Study 2 (AREDS2) reported a reduced risk of visual loss and a reduced risk of disease progression in patients with non-advanced age-related macular degeneration (AMD, the leading cause of blindness in the Western World; Taylor and Keeffe, 2001) who were supplemented with a formulation containing the macular carotenoids and co-antioxidants (The Age-Related Eye Disease Study 2 (AREDS2) Research Group, 2013, 2014).  Unfortunately, the AREDS2 preparation only contained two of macular pigment’s three carotenoids (lutein and 3R,3´R-zeaxanthin), and did not include meso-zeaxanthin, which is the dominant carotenoid at the very centre of the macula, and the presence of which is essential for maximum collective antioxidant effect.

In recent years, however, studies have shown that the addition of meso-zeaxanthin to formulations used to increase MP and enhance visual function in diseased and non-diseased retinas has proven very effective. Indeed, six head-to-head trials have shown that a formulation containing all three macular carotenoids in a meso-zeaxanthin:lutein:zeaxanthin (mg) ratio of 10:10:2  is superior to alternative formulations, in terms of visual improvements and in terms of observed increases in MP (the precise aim of supplementation). For a detailed description see the human safety studies below.

Use in poultry industries 
Broiler chickens are yellow when they are fed with carotenoid-containing feed, as these carotenoids are accumulated in skin and subcutaneous fat of the animal. Carotenoid deposition is also the cause of the yellow colour of egg yolk. For this reason, poultry producers add carotenoids (typically lutein, zeaxanthin, canthaxanthin and β-apo-8´-apocarotenal) to the feed to increase the attractiveness of the final product for the consumer, but also to support animal health. It is believed that lutein and zeaxanthin act synergistically to increase the yellow hue, whereas zeaxanthin is more powerful than lutein due to its larger chromophore. Therefore, a number of companies use marigold extract where a percentage of lutein has been converted into zeaxanthin (the meso form, meso-zeaxanthin) in order to supplement broilers and hens with both carotenoids. The isomer of zeaxanthin obtained from lutein is meso-zeaxanthin due to the nature of the technique used (see below). Indeed, meso-zeaxanthin has been identified in eggs from Mexico and California.

Production 

Meso-zeaxanthin is produced at an industrial level from the lutein obtained from marigold petals. The process involves saponification set at high temperature and high base concentrations, and leads to the isomerization of the 4´-5´double bond to the position 5´-6´. This converts the ɛ-ring of lutein into a β-ring, thus converting lutein into meso-zeaxanthin. The stereochemistry of this zeaxanthin is determined by the position of the hydroxyl group at the position 3´, which results in the "S" in the final zeaxanthin molecule. Therefore, the stereoisomer produced by this process is 3R,3´S-zeaxanthin (i.e. meso-zeaxanthin). The conditions of this saponification can be modulated in order to increase or decrease the conversion rate of lutein into meso-zeaxanthin.

Safety 
When a molecule is used commercially for human consumption, its safety has to be proven. First, it has to be shown that the molecule is innocuous for animal health, even when consumed at doses higher than the usual daily intake. The molecule can then be used in human studies.

Animal studies 
Meso-zeaxanthin has been tested for toxicity by several different research teams, with all these studies confirming the safety of this compound. 
A summary of the results of these studies are as follows:
 Chang et al demonstrated that the NOAEL ('No Observed-Adverse-Effect Level') was in excess of 200 mg/kg/day, far greater than doses used in dietary supplements, which are typically <0.5 mg/kg/day. Absence of mutagenicity was confirmed in the same study, using the Ames test.
 Xu et al concluded that meso-zeaxanthin has no acute toxicity and no genotoxicity and the use of meso-zeaxanthin is safe at a dose of 300 mg/kg body weight per day in rats from a 90 day feeding study. The authors then applied a 100 fold safety factor, and reported an ADI (acceptable daily intake) of 3 mg/kg body weight per day for meso-zeaxanthin.
 Thurnham et al demonstrated (in a rat model) that amounts of meso-zeaxanthin of 2, 20 and 200 mg/kg/day for 13 weeks had no adverse effects on animal health. In other words, the NOAEL is >200 mg meso-zeaxanthin/kg body weight and this is at least 1400 times higher than the typical supplement dose. Genotoxicity testing indicated that amounts of meso-zeaxanthin from 10 to 5000 µg/plate with or without microsomal enzymes did not increase mutation rates in five bacterial tester strains.
In summary, the NOAEL effect of meso-zeaxanthin is far greater than doses used in dietary supplements.
In 2011, the GRAS ('Generally Regarded As Safe') status of meso-zeaxanthin was acknowledged by the FDA in a reply to a proposal from a US company on the status of meso-zeaxanthin (plus L and Z).

Human safety studies 
Of note, meso-zeaxanthin is a regular dietary component in countries where it is a major pigment used by the poultry industry, particularly Mexico, and no adverse effects have been reported. In addition, the safety of meso-zeaxanthin has been tested in human clinical trials.

The first study to evaluate the effects of a dietary supplement containing predominantly meso-zeaxanthin was conducted in a Miami Florida research laboratory by Professors Bone and Landrum. This research confirmed that meso-zeaxanthin was effectively absorbed into the serum, and MP density was increased significantly in the supplementation group. No such increases were observed in the placebo group.

In another study done in Northern Ireland, 19 subjects consumed a supplement also composed of all three macular carotenoids, including meso-zeaxanthin over a period of 22 days. Results demonstrated that meso-zeaxanthin was absorbed. At the Institute of Vision Research, Waterford Institute of Technology, the Meso-zeaxanthin Ocular Supplementation Trials (MOST), have been conducted to evaluate safety, MP response and serum carotenoid response in subjects with and without AMD, following consumption of a supplement containing all three macular carotenoids in which meso-zeaxanthin was predominant. These studies confirmed safety for human consumption of the macular carotenoids following many biological tests to assess renal and liver function, lipid profile, hematologic profile, and markers of inflammation.

Also, the MOST trials identified statistically significant increases in serum concentrations of meso-zeaxanthin and lutein from baseline. Significant increases in central MP levels were also observed after just two weeks of supplementation. Furthermore, in patients who had an atypical MP distribution in the eye (i.e. they did not have the high concentration of pigment in the centre of the macula), when supplemented with a meso-zeaxanthin dominant supplement for 8 weeks, the more normal pigment profile was re-instated, whereas this was not the case when supplemented with a formulation lacking meso-zeaxanthin.

The main findings from the MOST trials in patients with AMD were published in 2013 and 2015. The series of publications from these trials concluded "Augmentation of the MP optical density across its spatial profile and enhancements in contrast sensitivity were best achieved after supplementation with a formulation containing high doses of meso-zeaxanthin in combination with lutein and zeaxanthin". Also, the final publication from this work, published in 2015, concluded that "The inclusion of meso-zeaxanthin in a supplement formulation seems to confer benefits in terms of MP augmentation and in terms of enhanced contrast sensitivity in subjects with early AMD. An important and novel finding rests on the observation that sustained supplementation with the macular carotenoids seems necessary to maximally augment MP and to optimize contrast sensitivity over a 3-year period in patients with early AMD".

In 2016 and 2017, two major clinical trials were published in the international journal, Investigative Ophthalmology & Visual Science (IOVS). These studies were funded by the European Research Council (Ref: 281096).  The first trial, the CREST (Central Retinal Enrichment Supplementation Trials) normal study involved 105 volunteers who underwent a series of complex tests of vision and were supplemented over a 12-month period. Of the 105 subjects, 53 received daily active supplements containing meso-zeaxanthin, lutein and zeaxanthin, while 52 subjects received a placebo (the control group). The outcome unequivocally demonstrates that those receiving macular carotenoids – lutein, zeaxanthin and meso-zeaxanthin – enjoyed meaningful benefits to their visual function. The improvement recorded was primarily in people’s contrast sensitivity – how much contrast a person needs to see a target (i.e. how faint an object can you see).This work demonstrates important implications for those who rely on their vision for professional reasons, such as high-performance sportspeople (most obviously golfers, cricketers, tennis and baseball players), motorists, train drivers, pilots, and police.

The second trial, CREST AMD was a major two-year trial involving over 100 people diagnosed with the early stages of AMD, and has shown an improvement in the vision of those taking a dietary supplement of carotenoids. Those living with AMD would usually have been expected to experience a continued deterioration in their vision over the two years of the clinical trial. Instead, those receiving carotenoids showed a significant improvement across 24 out of 32 tests of vision. 35% of trial participants had what is deemed to be a clinically meaningful improvement in their vision after 24 months, but only in the active supplement containing meso-zeaxanthin. Improvements in vision were particularly marked among those receiving all three carotenoids compared to those receiving only zeaxanthin and lutein. The research was conducted by a team from the Nutrition Research Centre Ireland (NRCI) at Waterford Institute of Technology (WIT).

See also
 Stereoisomerism

References 

Carotenoids
Cyclohexenes